The Improper Duchess is a 1936 British comedy film directed by Harry Hughes and starring Yvonne Arnaud, Hugh Wakefield and Wilfrid Caithness.  The film is based on the 1931 play of the same name by J. B. Fagan in which Arnaud had starred.

It was shot at Elstree Studios. The film's sets were designed by the art director David Rawnsley. It was made by the independent City Film Corporation, and released by the newly-established General Film Distributors.

Cast

References

Bibliography
 Low, Rachael. Filmmaking in 1930s Britain. George Allen & Unwin, 1985.
 Wood, Linda. British Films, 1927-1939. British Film Institute, 1986.

External links

1936 films
1936 comedy films
British comedy films
Films directed by Harry Hughes
Films shot at British International Pictures Studios
British films based on plays
British black-and-white films
Films scored by Eric Spear
1930s English-language films
1930s British films